Countess Albina du Boisrouvray (born 1941) is a former journalist and film producer who has become a global philanthropist and social entrepreneur working with AIDS victims and impoverished communities around the world. She is the founder of FXB International, a non-governmental organization established in memory of her son, François-Xavier Bagnoud.

Du Boisrouvray is a grandchild of the Bolivian King of Tin, Simón Patiño. She is a second cousin of Prince Rainier of Monaco and godmother to Charlotte Casiraghi, daughter of Princess Caroline of Monaco.

Early life and education
She is the daughter of Count Guy de Jacquelot du Boisrouvray (1903-1980) and Luz Mila Patiño Rodríguez (1909-1958) (her name is also reported as Luzmila). Her paternal grandmother was born countess Joséphine Marie Louise de Polignac, sister of Prince Pierre, Duke of Valentinois, the maternal grandfather of Rainier III, Prince of Monaco. Her maternal grandfather was Simón Patiño, one of the wealthiest men in the world at the time of her birth.

Her father was part of the Free French movement and her family left the country while she was an infant. Du Boisrouvray grew up in New York City and lived at the Plaza Hotel. Her family later moved to Argentina, and du Boisrouvray lived alone in Switzerland, Morocco, England and back to France.

Du Boisrouvray attended University of Sorbonne in Paris where she studied psychology and philosophy.

Career
Du Boisrouvray began her career as a journalist. She worked as a freelance journalist for Le Nouvel Observateur, covering international stories such as the death of Che Guevara. She later co-founded the literary magazine Libre with Juan Goytisolo.

In 1978, du Boisrouvray ran as a candidate for the Friends of the Earth party in parliamentary elections.

She founded a film production company, Albina Productions, in 1969 and is credited with producing 22 films over a period of 17 years. These films include Pascal Thomas' first film, Les Zozos (1972), L'important c'est d'aimer and Une Femme a sa fenêtre, both of which starred Romy Schneider, and Fort Saganne (1984), directed by Alain Corneau and starring Gérard Depardieu, Catherine Deneuve and Sophie Marceau. Police Python 357 (1976) notably was one of the few films which starred Yves Montand and Simone Signoret, a well-known couple, in the same film. Du Boisrouvray began serving as the chairperson of SEGH, her family's real estate and hotel management group, in 1980.

FXB International
Following the death of her only child, du Boisrouvray sold three-quarters of her assets including a jewelry collection auctioned by Sotheby's in New York for $31.2 million, an art collection of $20 million, and a substantial part of her family real-estate business which garnered $50 million. The Sotheby's auction was the largest jewelry sale since the Duchess of Windsor's auction. The sale included pre-Columbian gold, jade and other notable pieces accumulated by the noble French family. Du Boisrouvray allocated part of the profits to the FXB Foundation to create programs, including an at home palliative care program for the terminally ill in Switzerland and France, a rescue helicopter control centre in the Swiss Alps, and a professorship at the University of Michigan (her son's alma mater). The rest of the funds were used to found FXB International in memory of her son, François-Xavier Bagnoud, a search-and-rescue pilot who died while serving as a transport pilot in Mali during the Paris-Dakar rally in 1986.

Du Boisrouvray founded FXB International is to fight poverty and AIDS, and support orphans and vulnerable children left in the wake of the AIDS pandemic. FXB International offers comprehensive support to the families and communities that care for these children, and advocates for their fundamental rights. The organization has helped over 17 million people from programs in more than 100 countries, with a staff of over 450. Du Boisrouvray broadened its work from supporting children impacted by AIDS to also include all families needing support to emerge from extreme poverty and become self-sufficient through the FXBVillage methodology. In 1991, she developed the FXBVillage Methodology, a community-based, sustainable approach to overcoming the AIDS orphans crisis and extreme poverty. Each FXBVillage supports 80-100 families, comprising approximately 500 individuals, mostly children. Over a three-year period, FXB provides communities with the resources and training needed to become physically, financially and socially independent. According to FXB, the FXBVillage program has graduated over 69,500 participants from eight countries and has over 12,500 current participants.

In 1993, du Boisrouvray founded the FXB Center for Health and Human Rights at Harvard University, the first academic center to focus exclusively on health and human rights.

Awards and recognition
Du Boisrouvray was made Chevalier des Arts et des Lettres in 1985. In 1993, the University of Michigan conferred upon her a "Doctor of Humane Letters Degree," and she was made a "John Harvard Fellow" by Harvard University in 1996.

She received a Special Recognition Award for "Responding to the HIV/AIDS Orphan crisis" at the second conference on Global Strategies for the prevention of HIV transmission from mothers to infants in Montreal, in September 1999. In 2001, Harvard students presented her with the "Harvard Project for International Health and Development Award".

Her philanthropy and humanitarian efforts earned her a knighthood of the Légion d'Honneur in 2001 for her pioneering work in home palliative care projects. Also in 2001, because of the innovative cost-effective projects that she formulated and directed within FXB, she was selected as a member of the Social Entrepreneurs Group of the Schwab Foundation. This recognition enables the 54 social entrepreneurs of the group to participate in the Davos World Economic Forum and to present and to share their expertise with world business leaders in the civil and public sectors.

She was awarded the 2002 North-South Prize by the Council of Europe. In November 2003, du Boisrouvray received the "Lifetime Achievement Award" at the 4th International Conference on AIDS in India, in recognition for the projects that she initiated in the 35 States and Territories of India. In 2007, the French Fédération nationale des Clubs Convergences gave her an award for her activities on behalf of orphans and vulnerable children affected by AIDS in the world.

In 2004, Albina received the Thai Komol Keemthong Foundation Award for Outstanding Personality for the year 2004. The award was given in appreciation of her contributions to Thailand and Burma in the fields of protecting children and women's rights, education, vocational training and support of HIV/AIDS-affected children and their families.

In April 2009, French President Nicolas Sarkozy presented du Boisrouvray with the insignia of Officer in l'Ordre National du Mérite. The President honoured Albina and her work, saying "Your NGO is a model throughout the world. You are a woman involved. Your solidarity is exemplary and that is why the Republic will distinguish you." She is the first film producer to be awarded L'Ordre National du Mérite. In June 2009, du Boisrouvray received the BNP Paribas Jury's Special Prize.

In 2013, the Kalinga Institute of Social Sciences (KISS) awarded du Boisrouvray their KISS Humanitarian Award which recognizes individuals with exceptionally high contribution to society and who have distinguished themselves as humanitarians.

Personal life
Du Boisrouvray was married twice, first to Swiss aviator Bruno Bagnoud and second to French film producer Georges Casati, whom she divorced in 1982. She met Bagnoud while living in Valais. They were married for four years and had one son together, François-Xavier Bagnoud, born in 1961.

She lives in Portugal, near Lisbon, part of the year and has homes in Paris, New York and Switzerland.

References

External links
 Newark Visit Yields Millions For Youngest AIDS Patients, The New York Times, 4 October 1990
 Bio details
 FXB website

1941 births
Living people
French expatriates in the United States
French expatriates in Switzerland
French film producers
20th-century French philanthropists
Harvard University people
HIV/AIDS activists
Jewellery collectors
University of Paris alumni
21st-century French philanthropists